Mount Bushnell is a mountain,  high, between Mount Durham and Pincer Point in the northwest part of the Tapley Mountains. It was first roughly mapped by the Byrd Antarctic Expedition, 1928–30, and remapped by the United States Geological Survey, 1960–64. It was named by the Advisory Committee on Antarctic Names for Vivian C. Bushnell of the American Geographical Society, editor of the Society's Antarctic Map Folio Series.

References
 

Mountains of the Ross Dependency
Gould Coast